The German Handball Association (DHB) is the national Handball association of Germany. DHB organizes team handball within Germany and represents German handball internationally. The association has been a member of the International Handball Federation (IHF) since 1950, and also of the European Handball Federation (EHF) since 1991 just after the unification of the country. The DHB headquarters are in Dortmund.

Presidents

Competitions

Men's Senior Competitions
 Handball-Bundesliga (Division 1)
 2. Handball-Bundesliga (Division 2)
 German Handball Cup
 German Handball Super Cup

Women's Senior Competitions
 Women's Handball-Bundesliga (Division 1)
 2. Women's Handball-Bundesliga (Division 2)
 Women's German Cup

External links

European Handball Federation
Handball
Handball in Germany
Sports organizations established in 1949